Nkhotakota is a district in the Central Region of Malawi. The capital is Nkhotakota. The district covers an area of 4,259 km² and has a population of 395,897. The word Nkhotakota means "zig-zag" in Chichewa. It is located along the shore of Lake Malawi.

Demographics
At the time of the 2018 Census of Malawi, the distribution of the population of Nkhotakota District by ethnic group was as follows:
 75.8% Chewa
 10.4% Tonga
 3.9% Tumbuka
 2.1% Lomwe
 2.3% Ngoni
 1.9% Yao
 1.7% Sena
 0.5% Nyanja
 0.4% Nkhonde
 0.4% Mang'anja
 0.2% Lambya
 0.1% Sukwa
 0.2% Others

Government and administrative divisions

There are five National Assembly constituencies in Nkhotakota:

 Nkhotakota - Central
 Nkhotakota - North
 Nkhotakota - North East
 Nkhotakota - South
 Nkhotakota - South East

References

Districts of Malawi
Districts in Central Region, Malawi